Rio Grande (Portuguese for "great river") is a river in south-central Brazil. It rises in the Mantiqueira Mountains in the state of Minas Gerais and descends inland, west-northwestward. Its lower course marks a portion of the Minas Gerais-São Paulo border.

Major tributaries of the Rio Grande are:
 Rio Aiuruoca, whose source is in Itamonte;
 Rio das Mortes, whose source lies between Barbacena and Senhora dos Remédios;
 Rio Jacaré, whose source is in the Serra do Galba;
 Rio Sapucaí, whose source is in the Mantiqueira Mountains in São Paulo;
 Rio Pardo, whose source is in Ipuiúna.

The basin of the Rio Grande belongs to the Paraná River basin. The basin of the Rio Grande is responsible for about 67% of all energy generated in the state.

The Grande is interrupted by several dams and reservoirs; in the upper Grande the river forms Furnas Dam, then Peixotos Dam, and downstream, Luiz Barreto Dam, Jaguara Dam, Volta Grande Dam, Marimbondo Dam and Água Vermelha Dam.

The river plays a major role in production of electricity and, due to rapids and waterfalls, and absence of locks, is only navigable by small craft in limited stretches. However the Estrada de Ferro Oeste de Minas (a narrow gauge railway) operated a passenger and freight steam navigation service between 1889 and 1963. There were six stations on the river between Ribeirão Vermelho and Capetinga, and the railway operated a fleet of 6 stern-wheel paddle steamers, together with barges and launches. The service was halted by the completion of the Furnas Dam.

See also
Luiz Barreto (Estreito) Dam
Marimbondo Dam
Água Vermelha Dam
Furnas Dam
Parana River steamers

References

External links
 Rio Grande at Wikimapia, Google terrain view, centered on the site of the photo above

Rivers of Mato Grosso do Sul
Tributaries of the Paraná River
Rivers of São Paulo (state)
Rivers of Minas Gerais